Tarot is the sixth full-length album by the Spanish power metal band Dark Moor. The songs of the album are all named after the Major Arcana deck in the Tarot card game. The first single extracted from the album was "The Chariot". Manda Ophius of the Dutch symphonic metal band Nemesea is the guest female vocalist on Tarot. The final track, "the Moon", samples Ludwig van Beethoven's "Symphony No. 5" and "Moonlight Sonata". The bonus track, "Mozart's March" is based on Wolfgang Amadeus Mozart's "Rondo A'la Turca". It was also performed live in Granada, Spain, Piorno Rock, back in 2002, five years before it was even released.

Track listing
 "The Magician" - 1:29
 "The Chariot" - 4:20
 "The Star" - 4:25
 "Wheel of Fortune" - 3:55
 "The Emperor" - 4:07
 "Devil in the Tower" - 7:49
 "Death" - 4:58
 "Lovers" - 4:04
 "The Hanged Man" - 5:27
 "The Moon" - 11:28
 "The Fool" [bonus] - 4:12
 "Mozart's March [bonus] - 2:42

Personnel

Dark Moor
Alfred Romero - vocals
Enrik García - guitars, orchestral arrangements, producer
Daniel Fernández - bass
Roberto Cappa - drums

Guest/session musicians
Manda Ophuis - vocals
Hendrik Jan de Jong - guitar
Andy C. - drums
Sincopa 8 - choir

Crew
Derek Gores - artwork
Luigi Stefanini - producer, recording, mixing, mastering
Diana Álvarez - graphic design, band photography

References

2007 albums
Dark Moor albums
Scarlet Records albums
Tarotology